The Octagon House, also known as Zelotes Holmes House, is a historic octagonal house located in Laurens, South Carolina. Designed and built in 1859 to 1862 by the Rev. Zelotes Lee Holmes, a Presbyterian minister and teacher, it is thought to be the first concrete house erected in South Carolina. It was called the Zelotes Holmes House by the Historic American Buildings Survey.

Also known as the Old Holmes House, the Old Watson House and the Holmes-Watson House, it was added to the National Register of Historic Places on March 20, 1973.

See also
List of Registered Historic Places in South Carolina

References

External links

Holmes Family History page for Zelotes Lee Holmes

Houses completed in 1862
Houses on the National Register of Historic Places in South Carolina
Historic American Buildings Survey in South Carolina
Houses in Laurens County, South Carolina
Octagon houses in the United States
National Register of Historic Places in Laurens County, South Carolina
1862 establishments in South Carolina